Unforgettable Blast is a 2015 Chinese comedy film directed by Yan Tinglu. It was released in China on May 22, 2015.

Cast
Jiang Chao  
Jiang Xueming
Wang Xia
Yang Qing
Luo Jia
Jiang Yihong
Lei Di

Reception
By May 23, 2015, the film had earned  at the Chinese box office.

References

2015 comedy films
Chinese comedy films